Hasselgård is a surname. Notable people with the surname include:

Anders Hasselgård (born 1978), Norwegian footballer
Jostein Hasselgård (born 1979), Norwegian singer and musician
Stan Hasselgård (1922–1948), Swedish jazz clarinetist